Joseph-Dominique-Aldebert de Pineton, comte de Chambrun or Aldebert de Chambrun (1821-1899) was a French politician and businessman.

Early life
Aldebert de Chambrun was born on November 19, 1821 in Paris, France.

Career
De Chambrun served as the chairman of Baccarat. He served as a member of the Corps législatif from 1857 to 1870, representing Lozère. He served as a member of the Chamber of Deputies from 1871 to 1876, representing Lozère. He served as a member of the French Senate from 1876 to 1879.

Death
De Chambrun died on February 6, 1899.

Works

References

1821 births
1899 deaths
Politicians from Paris
Orléanists
Members of the 2nd Corps législatif of the Second French Empire
Members of the 3rd Corps législatif of the Second French Empire
Members of the 4th Corps législatif of the Second French Empire
Members of the National Assembly (1871)
French Senators of the Third Republic
Senators of Lozère
French businesspeople
French non-fiction writers